Eutreptornis ("changing bird")is a genus of extinct possible cariamiforme bird from the Late Eocene of Utah. It is traditionally considered to be a bathornithid, though a combination of the relative incompleteness of the material alongside some differences from other bathornithids have raised some suspicions about this affiliation.

Description

Eutreptornis is currently represented by a single type species, E. uintae, in turn represented by a tibiotarsus and tarsometatarsus from the Uinta Formation of Utah.

Biology

It is represented by the smallest bathornithid remains known. Due to the incompleteness of its remains it is unclear whereas it was flightless like other bathornithids. It was, however, most certainly a terrestrial predator, perhaps akin to its closest living relatives, the seriemas.

Ecology

Eutreptornis co-existed with a rich mammalian megafauna, such as the brontothere Megacerops, as well as other terrestrial birds, including other bathornithid birds such as the larger Bathornis species and the flightless crane-like geranoidids.

References

Bathornitidae
Eocene birds
Bird genera
Paleogene birds of North America
Taxa named by Joel Cracraft